Paul Collier is the name of several people including:
 Sir Paul Collier (born 1949), professor of economics and public policy, University of Oxford
 Paul Collier (snooker referee) (born 1970), Welsh snooker referee
 Paul Collier (activist) (died 2010), Australian disability activist and founder of the Dignity for Disability party. 
 Paul Collier (physicist), Head of Beams Department at CERN